Jonas Hartzell McGowan (April 2, 1837 – July 5, 1909) was a politician from the U.S. state of Michigan.

McGowan was born in Smith Township, Ohio (then part of Columbiana County, now Mahoning County). He was the eighth of ten children of Samuel and Susan McGowan. His paternal Scotch-Irish ancestors had fled religious persecution and settled in Pennsylvania. His father was a pioneer in Columbiana County, Ohio, where he cleared a tract of government land and occupied it as a homestead. In 1854, Samuel moved his family to Orland, Indiana, where he died in 1860. McGowan's mother was of German descent and survived the father for another four years. McGowan's father was an abolitionist and his house served as a depot on the Underground Railroad.

McGowan attended a seminary in Alliance, Ohio and the Orland Academy. He graduated from the University of Michigan at Ann Arbor in 1861 and taught in the city schools of Coldwater, Michigan for one year.  In 1862, he married Josephine Pruden, then preceptress at the High School in Coldwater.

During the Civil War, McGowan served in the Fifth and Ninth Regiments, Michigan Volunteer Cavalry. In August 1862, he enlisted as a private in the Fifth Regiment and was soon promoted to Sergeant of his Company. In November 1862, he was made a captain in the Ninth Regiment, and went into the field early in 1863. Their first service was chasing Confederate General John Hunt Morgan, who made incursions into southern Indiana and Ohio on Morgan's Raid. McGowan took part in the Battle of Salineville, which resulted in the capture of Morgan in July 1863, near Salineville, Ohio. He went into campaigns in East Tennessee with General Ambrose Burnside, until he was forced to resign in 1864 for reasons of poor health.

McGowan returned to Coldwater, where he studied law, was admitted to the bar in 1867, and commenced practice.  He served as prosecuting attorney of Branch County from 1868 to 1872.  He was also director of the Coldwater school board for six years.  He began serving as a member of the University of Michigan board of regents in 1870 and served until 1877 when he resigned after being elected to Congress. He also represented the 10th district in the Michigan Senate from 1873 to 1874.

In 1876, McGowan was elected as a Republican from Michigan's 3rd congressional district to the 45th United States Congress. He was re-elected to the 46th Congress and served from March 4, 1877 to March 3, 1881.  He declined to be a candidate for re-nomination in 1880.

Jonas H. McGowan resumed the practice of his profession in Washington, D.C., until his death in 1909.  He was interred in Oak Grove Cemetery, Coldwater, Michigan.

References

The Political Graveyard

1837 births
1909 deaths
Republican Party Michigan state senators
University of Michigan alumni
Regents of the University of Michigan
People from Mahoning County, Ohio
Republican Party members of the United States House of Representatives from Michigan
People from Orland, Indiana
19th-century American politicians